is a Japanese former football player who last played for Roasso Kumamoto.

Career
On October 30, 2011, he scored the only goal for his team against Yokohama FC with his head from his own half. The distance of 58.6 metres was thought to be a world record, but later measurements showed that the ball was headed in from 57.8 metres out. That means Jone Samuelsen still holds the record with 58.13 metres.

Ueda retired at the end of the 2019 season.

Club career statistics
Updated to 23 February 2017.

References

External links
Profile at Roasso Kumamoto

1988 births
Living people
Association football people from Osaka Prefecture
People from Kadoma, Osaka
Japanese footballers
J1 League players
J2 League players
J3 League players
Gamba Osaka players
Fagiano Okayama players
Roasso Kumamoto players
Association football defenders